Dick Turpin's Ride (reissued as The Lady and the Bandit) is a 1951 American adventure film directed by Ralph Murphy and starring Louis Hayward. It follows the career of the eighteenth century highwaymen Dick Turpin. It is based on the poem Dick Turpin's Ride by Alfred Noyes.

Plot
Highwayman Dick Turpin rides 200 miles to save his wife from the gallows in 18th-century England.

Cast
 Louis Hayward as Dick Turpin
 Patricia Medina as Joyce Greene
 Suzanne Dalbert as Cecile
 Tom Tully as Tom King
 John Williams as Archbald Puffin
 Malú Gatica as Baroness Margaret
 Alan Mowbray as Lord Charles Willoughby
 Lumsden Hare as Sir Robert Walpole
 Barbara Brown as Lady Greene
 Malcolm Keen as Sir Thomas de Veil
 Stapleton Kent as John Ratchett
 Sheldon Jett as Ramsey Jostin

References

External links

1951 films
American historical adventure films
1950s historical adventure films
1950s English-language films
Films scored by George Duning
Films set in the 1730s
Films set in England
Films directed by Ralph Murphy
Columbia Pictures films
Films based on poems
Cultural depictions of Dick Turpin
American black-and-white films
Films about highwaymen
1950s American films